Trstice is a large village and municipality in Galanta District of  the Trnava Region of south-west Slovakia.

Geography
It has a population of about 3,746 people.

History
In the 9th century, the territory of Trstice became part of the Kingdom of Hungary. In historical records the village was first mentioned in 1554.
After the Austro-Hungarian army disintegrated in November 1918, Czechoslovak troops liberated the area, later acknowledged internationally by the Treaty of Trianon. Between 1938 and 1945 Trstice was occupied by Miklós Horthy's Hungary through the First Vienna Award. From 1945 until the Velvet Divorce, it was part of Czechoslovakia. Since then it has been part of Slovakia.

International relations

Twin towns – Sister cities
Trstice is twinned with:
 Újbuda, Budapest, Hungary

References

External links
http://www.statistics.sk/mosmis/eng/run.html

Villages and municipalities in Galanta District